Advisory Commission of National and Democratic Parties was an alliance of political parties in Afghanistan, founded in October 2004. The provisional spokesperson of the AC-NDP was Zulfeqar Khan Omid.

Members of AC-NDP were:
Youth National Solidarity Party of Afghanistan (Jamil Karzai)
Republican Party of Afghanistan (Sebghatullah Sanjar))
Labour and Development Party of Afghanistan (Zulfeqar Khan Omid)
People's Welfare Party of Afghanistan (Mia Gul Wasiq
National Solidarity Party of the Tribes of Afghanistan (Muhammad Zarif Naseri)
De Milli Yauwalai Gund (Abdul Rashid Jalili)
Islamic Organisation "Young Afghanistan" (Seyyed Jawad Hossaini)
People's Aspiration Party of Afghanistan (Serajuddin Zaffari)
Understanding and Democracy Party of Afghanistan (Ahmad Shahin)
National Progress Party of Afghanistan (Asef Baktash
People's Felicity Party of Afghanistan (Muhammad Zubair Piruz)
Liberal Party of Afghanistan (Ajmal Sohail)
Solidarity Party of Afghanistan (Abdul Khaleq Nemat)
Freedom and Democracy Movement of Afghanistan (Abdul Raqib Jawed Kohestani)
People's Freedom Party of Afghanistan (Feda Muhammad Ehsas).
People's Message Party (Nur Aqa Ru'in)
United Afghanistan Party (Muhammad Wasel Rahimi)

The latter two joined the AC-NDP at a later stage.

References

2004 establishments in Afghanistan
Defunct political party alliances in Afghanistan
Political parties established in 2004